Winterfylleth (Ƿinterfylleþ) was the Anglo-Saxon or Old English name for the month of October. It marked and celebrated the beginning of winter.

The name of the month was recorded by Bede thus:

See also

 Anglo-Saxon
 Germanic calendar
 Old English
 Shire (Middle-earth)#Calendar

References

October
Old English